Piney Mountain is a census-designated place in Albemarle County, Virginia. The population as of the 2010 Census was 1,130.

Geography 
It is a suburban area located about ten miles north of Charlottesville, near the base of Piney Mountain, largely composed of the Briarwood and Camelot neighborhoods.

Demographics

References

Census-designated places in Albemarle County, Virginia
Census-designated places in Virginia